Jeffrey Howard Paulk (born April 26, 1976) is a former American football fullback in the National Football League (NFL). He was drafted by the Atlanta Falcons in the third round of the 1999 NFL Draft and also played for the New England Patriots. He played college football for the Arizona State Sun Devils.

References

External links
Patriots bio page

1976 births
Living people
Players of American football from Phoenix, Arizona
American football fullbacks
Arizona State Sun Devils football players
Atlanta Falcons players
New England Patriots players